Leonard Gardner is an American novelist.

Leonard Gardner may also refer to:

Len Gardner (1927 – 1990), Australian rules football player and umpire
Len Gardner (footballer, born 1931)

See also
Gardner (given name)
Gardner (surname)
Gardner (disambiguation)